The 2022 Florida A&M Rattlers football team represented Florida A&M University as a member of the East Division of the Southwestern Athletic Conference (SWAC) during the 2022 NCAA Division I FCS football season. Led by fourth-year head coach Willie Simmons, the Rattlers played their home games at Bragg Memorial Stadium in Tallahassee, Florida.

Previous season

The Rattlers finished the 2021 season with a record of 9–3, 7–1 SWAC play to finish in second place in the East Division. They received an at-large bid to the FCS playoffs for the first time since 2001, where they lost in the first round to Southeastern Louisiana.

Schedule

Game summaries

at North Carolina

vs. No. 15 Jackson State

Albany State

Alabama A&M

Mississippi Valley State

at South Carolina State

at Grambling State

Arkansas–Pine Bluff

Southern

at Alabama State

vs. Bethune–Cookman

References

Florida AandM
Florida A&M Rattlers football seasons
Florida AandM Rattlers football